The 2022–23 Bangladesh Super  Cup is the 4th edition of the Bangladesh Super Cup, the main domestic annual top tier clubs football tournament organized by Bangladesh Football Federation (BFF). The six participants will competes in the tournament.

Dhaka Mohammedan is the defending champion having defeated Sheikh Russel KC by 1(4)–1(2) goals penalties shoot-out in the final on 25 June 2013.

Format
Top four teams from the standings of the last season 2021–22 Bangladesh Premier League table will play directly while two teams from the rest of the professional football league will come through the qualification round.

Participating teams
The following six teams will contest in the tournament.

Venue
The venue of the tournament has not confirmed yet.

Draw
The draw ceremony of the tournament yet to be finalized.

Qualifying round
The fixtures of qualifying round yet to be announced.

References

Football cup competitions in Bangladesh
Bangladesh
2009 establishments in Bangladesh
Recurring sporting events established in 2009